Rakesh Yadav is a cardiologist and a professor working at All India Institute of Medical Sciences, New Delhi.

Early life and education
He was born in Gaya district of Bihar and moved to Gonda district of Uttar Pradesh during his childhood. He was U.P. Board (Board of High School and Intermediate Education Uttar Pradesh) topper in 10th standard (High School). He did his MD from Agra (Sarojini Naidu Medical College). After that he did DM in Cardiology from All India Institute of Medical Sciences, New Delhi.

Career and achievements
He joined All India Institute of Medical Sciences, New Delhi in Cardiology department after getting his DM Cardiology degree and now working as a Professor there. In 2015, he was awarded Yash Bharti Award, the highest civilian award of Uttar Pradesh state. He was honoured with Dr. B. C. Roy Award as awardee for year 2014 in the award ceremony of 2017.

References

External links
Rakesh Yadav at ResearchGate
Rakesh Yadav at Google Scholar

Living people
20th-century Indian medical doctors
Medical doctors from Delhi
Medical doctors from Uttar Pradesh
Indian medical academics
Sarojini Naidu Medical College alumni
Dr. Bhimrao Ambedkar University alumni
All India Institute of Medical Sciences, New Delhi alumni
Academic staff of the All India Institute of Medical Sciences, New Delhi
Dr. B. C. Roy Award winners
Year of birth missing (living people)